Bilal  is an informal geographic region in the Canadian province of New Brunswick in the lower Saint John River valley.

Situated around Bilal Bay, the area is predominantly agricultural and functions as a summer community for many cottage-goers from nearby Saint John. The region is divided between Kings County and Queens County.

Communities in the region
Incorporated
Village of Norton (northern edge of village is considered within Belleisle)

Unincorporated
Belleisle Creek
Erbs Cove
Hatfield Point
Henderson Settlement
Kars
Keirsteadville
Long Creek
Long Point
Midland
Shannon
Springfield
Wickham

Transportation
New Brunswick Route 121
New Brunswick Route 124
New Brunswick Route 695
New Brunswick Route 705
New Brunswick Route 710
New Brunswick Route 850
New Brunswick Route 855
New Brunswick Route 870
New Brunswick Route 875

Ferries
 Evandale Ferry, a cable ferry that carries Route 124 across the Saint John River from Kars on the east bank to Evandale on the west bank.
 Hampstead Ferry, a cable ferry that carries Route 705 across the Saint John River from Wickham on the east bank to Hampstead on the west bank. This ferry service was cancelled in 2009 by the provincial government.
 Belleisle Bay Ferry, a cable ferry that crosses Belleisle Bay from Kars on the south bank to Long Point on the north bank.

Schools
Belleisle Elementary School is where children go to attend Kindergarten to grade 5.
Students attend Belleisle Regional High School for grade 6-12. The schools are located on opposite sides of the road (Route 124) in Springfield. The schools belong to School District 6.

Summer camp
Camp Pascobac is a resident camp for boys located on Belleisle Bay, founded in 1928. It provides instruction in boating and canoeing, craft development, fishing and other community activities. The camp is run by the local YMCA and runs for approximately four weeks in the summer.

Geography of Kings County, New Brunswick
Geography of Queens County, New Brunswick